George Bigelow Rogers (1870–1945) was an American architect, best known for the wide variety of buildings that he designed in Mobile, Alabama, including mansions in historic European styles and other private residences, churches and public buildings, and the first 11-story skyscraper in Mobile and the Southeast United States. Many of his structures have been listed on the National Register of Historic Places.

Biography
Rogers was born  in Illinois in 1870. After attending local schools there, he studied painting in France. He apprenticed as an architect from 1894 to 1898 at a firm in Hartford, Connecticut. While en route to a vacation in Mexico in 1901, he stopped in Mobile.

Rogers was quite taken with the city and decided to settle there. He went on to design many of what today are among its best known buildings. He was made a Fellow of the American Institute of Architects in 1941, an honor bestowed on fewer than two percent of all registered architects in the United States.

Rogers died in Mobile in 1945.

His architectural library is housed in the archives of the Historic Mobile Preservation Society.

Projects in Mobile, Alabama
George Fearn House (1904), listed on the National Register of Historic Places
Van Antwerp Building (1907), on the National Register of Historic Places
Burgess-Maschmeyer Mansion (1907) at 1209 Government Street 
Tacon-Bellingrath House (1908) at 60 South Ann Street (Destroyed)
Dave Patton House (1915), on the National Register of Historic Places
Albert Bush House (1915) at 1203 Government Street 
Government Street Methodist Church (1904–1917) at 901 Government Street
Scottish Rite Temple (1921), on the National Register of Historic Places
Shannon T. Hunter House (1923)
Murphy High School Complex (1926), on the National Register of Historic Places
Bellingrath Gardens and Home (1927), on the National Register of Historic Places
Mobile Public Library (1928), on the National Register of Historic Places
Thomas Byrne Memorial Library (1930), Spring Hill College 
Davis Avenue Branch of the Mobile Public Library in Mobile, Alabama (1931); now operating as the National African American Archives and Museum, it is listed on the National Register of Historic Places
Leo Brown House at 1668 Government Street (1937)

Other projects
Masonic Temple (Foley, Alabama) (c.1925), Mission Revival in style, included in Foley Downtown Historic District

See also
National Register of Historic Places listings in Alabama
National Register of Historic Places listings in Mobile, Alabama

References

1869 births
1945 deaths
Architects from Alabama
Spanish Colonial Revival architects
Mediterranean Revival architects
Fellows of the American Institute of Architects
People from Mobile, Alabama
George Bigelow Rogers buildings